Arachnacris corporalis is a species of bush crickets or katydids that is native to Malaysia.

References

Mecopodinae
Taxa named by Heinrich Hugo Karny
Taxa described in 1924